The Man from Downing Street is a 1922 American silent starring Earle Williams, Charles Hill Mailes, Betty Ross Clark  and Boris Karloff. The screenplay was written by Bradley J. Smollen, based on a screen story by Clyde C. Westover, Lottie Horner and Florine Williams. It is thought to be a lost film.

Plot
Captain Robert Kent (Williams) of the London Secret Service is assigned to Delhi to discover the person responsible for the passing out of government information from the British Commission in India. He is disguised as a Rajah and is the guest of Colonel Wentworth (Mailes), who is in charge of the district. Wentworth is the only one who knows Kent's identity, and the two follow up on one clue after another as several persons become implicated. Finally, only two men remain as the logical suspects. To catch the guilty party, Kent confides to the Colonel that he has issued instructions to the London office to send cables to each of the two suspects on two different matters of commercial importance with the idea being that the subsequent leak of information would reveal the guilty party. The plan works and guilt is attached to Captain Graves (Prior), whom Colonel Wentworth claims has started a rumor on the subject suggested in one of the cables. However, the fact that the Colonel has accused Captain Graves proves that the Colonel was the guilty party as Captain Kent announces that neither of the two cables had ever actually been sent. Trapped, the Colonel is forced to confess.

Cast
 Earle Williams as Capt. Robert Kent
 Charles Hill Mailes as Col. Wentworth
 Boris Karloff dual role as Maharajah Jehan Dharwar and Dell Monckton
 Kathryn Adams as Norma Graves
 Herbert Prior as Capt. Graves
 Eugenia Gilbert as Sarissa
 James Butler as Lt. Wyndham
 George Stanley as Sir Edward Craig
 Henry A. Barrows as Maj. Barnham

See also
 Boris Karloff filmography

References

External links

1922 films
1922 adventure films
American silent feature films
American adventure films
American black-and-white films
Films directed by Edward José
Vitagraph Studios films
1920s American films
Silent adventure films
1920s English-language films